Sandra Ponthus (born 29 November 1976) is a French former diver. She competed in the women's 3 metre springboard event at the 2000 Summer Olympics.

References

External links
 

1976 births
Living people
French female divers
Olympic divers of France
Divers at the 2000 Summer Olympics
People from Villeurbanne
Sportspeople from Lyon Metropolis